Terry Alan Fox (1943 – 14 October 2008) was an American Conceptual artist known for his work in performance art, video, and sound. He was of the first generation conceptual artists and he was a central participant in the West Coast performance art, video and Conceptual Art movements of the late 1960s and early 1970s. Fox was active in San Francisco and in Europe, living in Europe in the latter portion of his life.

Biography 
Fox was in 1943 born in Seattle, Washington. At the age of seventeen in 1960, he was diagnosed with Hodgkin’s Disease. His Hodgkin’s Disease was later referencing the cycles of illness and wellness in several artworks. He studied art at Cornish College of the Arts (1961), while working at Boeing Aircraft. He continued his studies at Accademia di Belle Arti di Roma (1962). Fox was largely self taught in video art. He was in remission of Hodgkin's Disease by 1972. 

Fox was an important figure in post-minimal sculpture, conceptual art, performance, and video art on the West Coast. Before permanently moving to Europe, he was based in San Francisco in the late 1960s and 1970s and was associated with the underground art scene. Fox moved often and lived in the following cities - Rome (1962), San Francisco (1963–1966, late 1968–1978), Paris (1967–early 1968, 1972), Naples (1983–1984), New York City (1978–1979). In 1980, he moved to Europe permanently and eventually settled in Liège, Belgium.

His seminal series of works (environments, performances, sculptures, drawings) produced over an eight-year period was based on the theme of the configuration of the Chartres Labyrinth.

He died in Cologne, Germany on 14 October 2008.

Fox has been included in numerous international solo and group exhibitions including the documenta 5, Kassel, 1975 Whitney Biennial and 1984 Venice Biennale. He had two major exhibitions in Berkeley, his first solo museum show curated by Brenda Richardson in 1973, and one in 1985 organized around the body of works owned by the Berkeley Art Museum organized by Constance Lewallen. His retrospective solo exhibition was organized by the Kunsthalle Fridericianum, Kassel in 2003.

Works

Performance work

Filmography

Discography
Berlino\Rallentando. LP record. Eindhoven, The Netherlands: Het Appollohuis, 1989.
Isolation Unit (Terry Fox: Pipes; Joseph Beuys: Seeds). (Extended play record, produced by the artists), 1970. Edition 500.
Linkage. LP record with text by Martin Kunz. Lucerne, Switzerland: Kunstmuseum, 1982.
Mag Magazine #3: Joan La Barbara/Terry Fox. Audiocassette edition. Vienna, Austria: Galerie Grita Insam, 1979.
Revolutions per Minute. One cut on record of artists' sound works. New York: Ronald Feldman Fine Arts, 1982.
The Labyrinth Scored for the Purrs of 11 Different Cats. Audiocassette. Eindhoven, The Netherlands: Het Appollohuis, 1989.

Bibliography
Richardson, Brenda. ‘’Terry Fox’’. Berkeley: University Art Museum, University of California, 1973.
 Foley, Suzanne. Space Time Sound, Conceptual Art in the San Francisco Bay Area: The 1970s. San Francisco: San Francisco Museum of Modern Art, 1981. 
 Albright, Thomas. Art of the San Francisco Bay Area, 1945 - 1980. Berkeley: University of California Press, 1985. , 
 University of Massachusetts Amherst, University Gallery. In site: five conceptual artists from the Bay Area: Terry Fox, Howard Fried, David Ireland, Paul Kos, Tom Marioni: University Gallery, Fine Arts Center, University of Massachusetts Amherst, February 2 March 17, 1990. Amherst: University Gallery, University of Massachusetts Amherst, 1990.
 Fox, Terry, Eva Schmidt, Matthias Osterwold, Bern Schulz; ‘’Terry Fox: Works with Sound’’. Kehrer; 2003, 
 Phillips, Glenn, ed. California Video: Artists and Histories. Los Angeles: Getty Research Institute and J. Paul Getty Museum, 2008,

References

External links
Recalling Terry Fox a project of the Terry Fox Association
Selected videos are distributed by Electronic Arts Intermix, New York
 Artist Biography of Terry Fox at Electronic Arts Intermix .
Terry Fox's 1970s performances and video works from Performance Anthology: Source book of California Performance Art, 1981
Selected videos are distributed by Montevideo/Netherlands Media Art Institute, Amsterdam
Works by Terry Fox in the collection of the San Francisco Museum of Modern Art
Works by Terry Fox in the collection of the Berkeley Art Museum and Pacific Film Archive
Terry Fox biography on Media Art Net
Prints by Terry Fox at Crown Point Press, San Francisco

 

1943 births
2008 deaths
American sound artists
American conceptual artists
American performance artists
20th-century American artists
21st-century American artists
Artists from Seattle
Cornish College of the Arts alumni
Accademia di Belle Arti di Roma alumni
American experimental filmmakers